The Secret of Eel Island is a Channel Five drama series, that revolves around the secret of Eel Island, The first series contained twelve episodes and the second series thirteen episodes.

Cast
Ben Kerfoot as Malachite

Episode list

Series 1

Series 2

References

External links
Official site

2000s British drama television series
2000 British television series debuts
2000 British television series endings
English-language television shows